Krasnensky (masculine), Krasnenskaya (feminine), or Krasnenskoye (neuter) may refer to:
Krasnensky District, a district of Belgorod Oblast, Russia
Krasnensky (rural locality) (Krasnenskaya, Krasnenskoye), name of several rural localities in Russia